The list of shipwrecks in October 1943 includes ships sunk, foundered, grounded, or otherwise lost during October 1943.

1 October

2 October

3 October

4 October

5 October

6 October

7 October

8 October

9 October

10 October

11 October

12 October

13 October

14 October

15 October

16 October

17 October

18 October

19 October

20 October

21 October

22 October

23 October

24 October

25 October

26 October

27 October

28 October

29 October

30 October

31 October

Unknown date

References

1943-10